Pentagram is a design firm. It was founded in 1972, by Alan Fletcher, Theo Crosby, Colin Forbes, Kenneth Grange, and Mervyn Kurlansky at Needham Road, Notting Hill, London. The company has offices in London, New York City, San Francisco, Berlin and Austin, Texas. In addition to its influential work, the firm is known for its unusual structure, in which a hierarchically flat group of partners own and manage the firm, often working collaboratively, and share in profits and decisionmaking.

History
Alan Fletcher, Colin Forbes, and Bob Gill announced the opening of design studio Fletcher/Forbes/Gill on April 1, 1962. Three years later, Gill left the firm, and Fletcher and Forbes were joined by architect Theo Crosby, forming Crosby/Fletcher/Forbes in 1965. The firm was successful and grew in size, and in the early 1970s, they discussed formalizing a new partnership together with one of their associate designers, Mervyn Kurlansky, and product designer Kenneth Grange.

In 1972, the now-five partners established a new business structure, and renamed the firm as Pentagram. The name was inspired by the number of establishing partners, which is the same as the number of points on a pentagram. In 1982, the partners moved from an office at the rear of Paddington railway station to a new space in Needham Road, in the Notting Hill area of West London. A former dairy, the space was designed by Theo Crosby and remains as Pentagram's London office.

In 1978 Colin Forbes moved from London to the US to form the New York office, eventually adding graphic designers Peter Harrison and Woody Pirtle as partners. In 1990-91 Michael Bierut, Paula Scher, both graphic designers, and James Biber, an architect, joined the New York office. They eventually moved to a building at 204 Fifth Avenue, a building designed by C. P. H. Gilbert, where the office resided until 2017. The New York office is now located in a building at 250 Park Avenue.

Scope and clientele
Pentagram is best known for its work in graphic design and corporate identity, but as partners have joined and left has also worked in architecture, interiors, wayfinding and environmental design, packaging, product and industrial design and sound design. Among others, they have developed or updated identities for  Citibank, Sam Labs,  Saks Fifth Avenue, United Airlines, the Big Ten Conference, and The Co-operative brand.

In addition to graphic design work, the firm has partners working on architectural projects such as the Harley-Davidson Museum, the Alexander McQueen shops, Citibank interiors, the Adshel and Clear Channel buildings in London, a host of private residences including the Phaidon Atlas of Architecture listed Bacon Street Residence, the new London club Matter, along with a range of other interior, retail, restaurant and exhibition projects. Pentagram was hired to redesign the American cable television programme, The Daily Show'''s set and on-screen graphics in 2005. In 2016 Pentagram were commissioned to design the packaging for the Pink Floyd box set, The Early Years 1965–1972. The set was released in November 2016. In 2019, Pentagram were commissioned to rebrand the entirety of Warner Bros. In 2022, Pentagram were commissioned to create a new logo for season 48 of Saturday Night Live.

Beyond work for commercial clients, Pentagram also works with cultural institutions and does pro bono work for non-profit organisations. On 12 February 2008 the President's Council on Service and Civic Participation awarded Pentagram the "DNA" award for incorporating pro bono services into their business culture. Recently, Pentagram has done work for the One Laptop per Child, the High Line, New York's Public Theater, and the National Gallery of Art.

 Partners 
Pentagram was founded on the premise of collaborative interdisciplinary partners working together in an independently owned firm of equals, both financially and creatively. Theo Crosby claimed the structure was suggested to him by his experience of working on the seminal late-1950s exhibition This Is Tomorrow: "it was my first experience at a loose, horizontal organisation of equals. We have brought it... to a kind of practical and efficient reality at Pentagram".

The firm currently comprises 22 partner-designers, each managing a team of designers and sharing in common overhead and staff resources. The partners in each office share incomes equally and all the partners own an equal portion of the total firm. This equality, along with the tradition of periodically inviting new members to join, renews the firm while giving even the newest members an equal footing with the partners of long standing. This 'flat' organisation (there are no executive officers, CEO, CFO or board, other than the entire group of partners) along with the self-capitalised finances of the business, allows equal participation and control of the group's destiny by each member.

 Current partners 

 Partners emeriti 

 References 
Bibliography
 "Pentagram." The Design Encyclopedia. Ed. Mel Byars. 2nd ed. New York: Museum of Modern Art, 2004. 431.
 "Pentagram." The Thames and Hudson Dictionary of 20th-Century Design and Designers. Ed. Guy Julier. New York: Thames and Hudson, 1999. 153.
 Profile: Pentagram Design'', by Rick Poynor and Susan Yelavich, Phaidon Press Ltd, 2004. (978-0714843773)

Notes

External links
Official website

Graphic design studios
Industrial design firms
Design companies of the United States
Architecture firms based in London
Design companies established in 1972
British companies established in 1972